LHA 120-N 55 is an emission nebula located within the Large Magellanic Cloud (LMC). It is a glowing clump of gas and dust that gets its light output from the hydrogen atoms shedding electrons within it.  It was named in 1956, in a catalogue of H-alpha emission line objects in the LMC.

Multiple dense molecular clumps have been detected, at least fifteen of which contain young stellar objects.

References

Emission nebulae
Large Magellanic Cloud
Dorado (constellation)